Wang Li or Li Wang may refer to the following Chinese people:

Wang Li (linguist) (1900–1986), linguist of Chinese
Wang Li (politician) (1922–1996), politician, member of the Cultural Revolution Group
Wang Li (cyclist) (born 1962), Olympic cyclist
Wang Li (pianist) (born 1974), pianist
Wang Li (actor), in 2 Champions of Shaolin

See also
Wan Li